Nguyễn Thị Xuân Mai (born 2 July 1979) is a Vietnamese taekwondo practitioner.

She competed at the 2000 Summer Olympics in Sydney. She won a silver medal at the 1998 Asian Games in Bangkok.

References

External links

1979 births
Living people
Vietnamese female taekwondo practitioners
Olympic taekwondo practitioners of Vietnam
Taekwondo practitioners at the 2000 Summer Olympics
Taekwondo practitioners at the 1998 Asian Games
Taekwondo practitioners at the 2002 Asian Games
Asian Games medalists in taekwondo
Medalists at the 1998 Asian Games
Asian Games silver medalists for Vietnam
20th-century Vietnamese women